Runaway Love is an EP by American recording group En Vogue. It was released by East West Records on September 21, 1993 in the United States. The EP followed their multi-platinum hit album Funky Divas in 1992. The EP contains the title track, "Runaway Love" featuring FMob, known as Thomas McElroy and Denzil Foster.

Critical reception

AllMusic editor Stephen Thomas Erlewine rated the EP two stars out of five. He found that "apart from the great title track, there is little in this collection of filler and remixes of interest to anyone but dedicated fans." James Earl Hardy from Entertainment Weekly wrote: "Even on an EP, the ladies have got it goin’ on. The remixes of "Hip Hop Lover," "Desire," and "What Is Love" are smokin’, while the new tunes [...] prove these divas have more in common with The Emotions and The Sweet Inspirations than with The Supremes."

Commercial reception
Runaway Love debuted at number 57 on the US Billboard 200 and number 17 on the Top R&B/Hip-Hop Albums chart in the week of July 5, 1997, with first-week sales of 17,500 copies. It eventually peaked at number 49 on the Billboard 200 and 16 on the Top R&B/Hip-Hop Albums chart. The self-titled lead single from Runaway Love quickly became a hit on US Pop and R&B: Also included is the hit collaboration with Salt-N-Pepa, titled "Whatta Man", a top five hit on Billboard's Hot 100 and Top R&B Songs. The EP also features new remixes of "What Is Love", "Desire", and "Hip Hop Lover" from the Funky Divas album.

Track listing
All songs written and produced by Denzil Foster and Thomas Elroy, except noted otherwise.

Credits and personnel
Credits adapted from the liner notes of Runaway Love.

Lead Vocals, Backing Vocals – Cindy Herron, Dawn Robinson, Terry Ellis, Maxine Jones
Arranged – Thomas McElroy And Denzil Foster
Production – Angela Skinner, Marie McElroy
Guitar – Marlon McClain 
Flute – Lewis Taylor 
Backing Vocals – 3 Feet
Keyboards, Drum Programming – Denzil Foster, Thomas McElroy 
Rap Vocals – Kam 
Keyboards – Leroy Romans
Bass – Wycliff "Steelie" Johnson
Rap Vocals – FMob

Management – David Lombard
Art Direction – Jean Cronin
Mastered [EP] – Tony Dawsey
Recorded – Steve Counter, Steven Hart 
Mixed [Mixing Engineer] – Ken Kessie
Design – Cicero deGuzman Jr. 
Photography – James Calderaro
Composer – Hurby Azor, Cheryl James
Composer – Thomas McElroy, Denzil Foster
Executive-Producer – Thomas McElroy, Denzil Foster
Producer – Denzil Foster, Thomas McElroy

Charts

References

En Vogue albums
1993 EPs